{{Infobox school
 | name                    = Tiffin School
 | image                   = Tiffin logo.png
 | image_size              = 150px
 | coordinates             = 
 | pushpin_map             = United_Kingdom London_Kingston upon Thames#United_Kingdom Greater_London#United_Kingdom England#United_Kingdom
 | motto                   = Faire Sans Dire  (French: 'To do without saying')
 | established             = 1880
 | closed                  = 
 | type                    = Grammar school Academy
 | religion                = 
 | president               = 
 | head_label              = Headteacher
 | head                    = Mike Gascoigne
 | r_head_label            = 
 | r_head                  = 
 | chair_label             = 
 | chair                   = Phil Phillips
 | founders                = John and Thomas Tiffin
 | address                 = Queen Elizabeth Road
 | city                    = Kingston upon Thames
 | county                  = Greater London
 | country                 = England
 | postcode                = KT2 6RL
 | dfeno                   = 314/5400
 | specialists             = Arts (performing) and language
 | urn                     = 136910
 | ofsted                  = yes
 | staff                   = c.95
 | enrolment               = 1,418
 | gender                  = Boys (Co-Ed 16-18)
 | lower_age               = 11
 | upper_age               = 18
 | houses                  = Churchill-Gordan, Darwin-Wilberforce, Drake, Kingsley-Montgomery, Livingstone, Raleigh, Scott, Turing-Nightingale
 | colours                 = Red, blue
 | free_label_1            = Former pupils
 | free_1                  = Old Tiffinians
 | free_label_2            = 
 | free_2                  = 
 | free_label_3            = 
 | free_3                  = 
 | website                 = http://www.tiffinschool.co.uk
}}
Tiffin School is a boys' grammar school in Kingston upon Thames, England. It has specialist status in both the performing arts and languages. The school moved from voluntary aided status to become an Academy School on 1 July 2011. Founded in 1880, Tiffin School educates 1,058 pupils as of February 2019.

Admissions
Entry into the school is by academic selection, using both an English and a mathematics test. The school admits 180 students each year in year 7. Since at least 2002, students have been able to apply to join Tiffin for Sixth Form (Years 12 and 13); approximately 35-40% of the boys are 'new boys', from other schools. Admission to the sixth form is based on GCSE results. From September 2019, the Sixth Form became co-educational and admits around 80 girls. Tiffin remains an all boys’ school from Years 7 to 11.

Identity
The school colours of red and blue date from the time of its original foundation in the seventeenth century.  The school's coat of arms, with three salmon, is based on that of the Royal Borough of Kingston upon Thames.  The uniform for years 7–10 is in the same colours with blue and red stripes. For years 11 it is a full dark blue outfit.

History

Two prosperous brewers from Kingston, John and Thomas Tiffin, left money in their wills in 1638 for the education of local people. At first, the money was used for scholarships to attend local schools. However, the fund grew through investment returns and additional donations, so by the 1820s nearly 110 children were benefiting from the fund.

By 1869, when the charity schools had closed and the money was no longer needed by the Public Secondary School, the charity's trustees proposed to support Kingston Grammar School.  There was a debate until 1872 when it was decided that Kingston Grammar School should receive no more than a quarter of the income from the charity.

Plans were therefore drawn up in 1874 for two new schools; Tiffin Boys' School and Tiffin Girls' School, each taking 150 pupils. A single building by the Fairfield housing both schools was opened in January 1880.

In 1929, the boys' school moved to its present site, in Queen Elizabeth Road near the centre of Kingston.  It became a grammar school under the Education Act 1944.  The school changed from being voluntary-controlled to being grant-maintained in 1992.  On 1 July 2011, the school achieved Academy status.

New buildings

In 1937, a new building was opened for the Girls' School for 480 pupils. They had previously been in the same building as the Boys' School.

The school site has expanded and now has a Sports Centre, Performing Arts Centre, South Building, Judge Lecture Theatre and Learning Resource Centre (named the Dempsey Centre after a former head). The Sports Centre is used for exams and indoor sports activities. The Performing Arts Centre is used for the teaching of drama, art, music and design and technology.  The South Building is used for the teaching of Mathematics, English and Modern Foreign Languages. The Judge Lecture Theatre is used as a lecture theatre for external events and internal classes. The Learning Resource Centre is used as a library, IT suite and career development office.

In 2011, an all-weather AstroTurf pitch was erected on part of the old grass field, funded by Jim Dixon and a National Lottery grant.  The cricket nets were refurbished and named the Neil Desai cricket nets to commemorate his death.

Over the course of late 2017 and early 2018, a new building attached to the existing Dempsey Centre was opened. This was funded by the government (£3,000,000).  An additional £250,000 was raised from donations. In this building, a new IT room was installed, a canteen and six maths classrooms. This has meant there is less space for on-site car parking and recreational play during lunchtimes and breaks.

Present day

There are between 180 and 190 boys in each year, and about 500 in the Sixth Form. In 2019, the school began admitting girls to the sixth form, with an aim to have at least 100 girls overall between the Lower and Upper Sixth.  
The Dempsey Centre, named after Dr Tony Dempsey, who retired as head in 2004, was opened in September of that year.
It contains ICT suites, a lecture theatre, a library and a new careers office.

In 2004, Sean Heslop took over as head of Tiffin School, due to Dempsey's retirement. Heslop subsequently left the school in 2009 to take a position at Folkestone Academy.  He was subsequently arrested and bailed by the police on the charge of abusing a position of trust with a minor.  He was acquitted of all charges.

In 2009, Hilda Clarke became the first female head of Tiffin School.  She is a former head of Langley Grammar School in Slough and former deputy head of Tiffin Girls' School in Kingston upon Thames.  In November 2014, it was announced that Clarke had stepped down and was replaced by the former deputy head and longstanding history teacher Mike Gascoigne.

Ofsted report
The Ofsted report in 2002 stated that "the school is very popular; annually, it receives around 1,300 applications for the 140 available places.  Very nearly all 16-year-olds continue into the Sixth Form and around 40 more join the Sixth Form each year from other schools.  On entry, the pupils’ and Sixth Form students’ attainment is very high compared with the national average."  In the 2007 Ofsted Report, Tiffin was rated outstanding (grade 1) in every area.

In the 2013 Ofsted Report, pupils' exam results overall were in the top 40% of similar schools' results, and in the top 20% of all schools.

In the 2022 Ofsted Report, Tiffin was rated 'good' (grade 2) overall. 

Academic achievement
According to the Sunday Times Parent Power Guide, the school is ranked 10th in the top hundred State Secondary Schools based on 2011 examination results.  The 2011 results for the school are:

 A-level %A*-B: 90.9
 GCSE %A*-A: 82.8
In 2022, the school achieved its "best set of grades" for GCSEs and A levels in the last 10 years. 

 A-level %A*-B: 91.46
 GCSE %9-7: 84.52

Music
The school has a choir and several musical ensembles, including a swing band, and many of its pupils are members of Thames Youth Orchestra. Every year, the school performs an oratorio either held in the Rose Theatre or the Tiffin Sports Hall, which consists of students, parents, staff and friends and is accompanied by the London Mozart Players or the Brandenburg Symphony Orchestra or the Sinfonia Britannica. 

Tiffin Boys' Choir
The Tiffin Boys' Choir (directed by James Day), which celebrated its 60th anniversary in 2017, performs at venues including the Royal Opera House, the Royal Festival Hall, and the Barbican with London orchestras, and it regularly goes on tour. The choir has recorded CDs such as Rejoice in the Lamb and Christmas at Tiffin. It has also appeared on recordings of Mahler with Klaus Tennstedt, Puccini's Tosca with Antonio Pappano and Britten's War Requiem with Kurt Masur. The choir was featured on the last episode of TFI Friday, on the soundtrack of A Christmas Carol'' starring Kate Winslet, and on the subsequently released top-ten Kate Winslet single "What If".

Sports
Tiffin School is active in all the main sports. It has facilities for rugby, athletics, football and cricket at a 29-acre (119,000 m²) site in East Molesey near Hampton Court, known as Grist's (named after a former headmaster). Tiffin School Boat Club is based at Canbury Boathouse, which is shared with Kingston Rowing Club along the Thames at Canbury Gardens. The school has a sports hall and all-weather AstroTurf pitch which are used by external sports clubs after and before school hours. Tiffin School provides ball boys for The Championships, Wimbledon.

Old Tiffinians
Former pupils are known as Old Tiffinians. The Tiffinian Association arranges reunion events such as dinners and sports fixtures.

Notable former pupils

Arts and entertainment
 Gethin Anthony, actor
 John Bratby, painter and writer
 James Seymour Brett, composer
 Herbie Flowers, musician
 Inno Genga, musician
 Jake Hendriks, actor
 Rich Keeble, actor
 Andrew Lawrence, comedian
 Neil McDermott, actor
 Jonny Lee Miller, actor
 Will Varley, musician
Alan Wheatley, theatrical performer, BBC announcer and star of the TV series Adventures of Robin Hood
Roderick Williams, singer

Education and politics
 Ralph Allwood, choral conductor, composer and teacher
 Tom Bloxham MBE, founder of Urban Splash and currently Chancellor of the University of Manchester
 James Boyden, Labour MP for Bishop Auckland
 Michael Dixon, Director of the Natural History Museum
 Philip Eggleton, discoverer of Phosphagens
 Chris Heaton-Harris, Conservative MP for Daventry (1979–86)
 Dennis Lindley, statistician

Sport
 Neil Bennett, rugby union player for England 
 Mark Feltham, cricketer
 Arun Harinath, cricketer Surrey CCC
 Rob Henderson, rugby union player for Ireland and the British and Irish Lions 
 Gregor Kennis, cricketer
 Cameron McGeehan, footballer
 David Ottley, cricketer
 Alec Stewart OBE, former England cricket captain

Other
 Captain Douglas Belcher, Victoria Cross recipient
 Roy Chaplin, aircraft designer at Hawker Aircraft, worked on Hawker Hurricane, Hawker Hunter and Hawker Siddeley Harrier.
 Reginald Foster Dagnall, founder of RFD and British aviation pioneer

 Frank Dobson lichenologist and businessman
 Commander Roddy Elias, Swordfish navigator who flew from HMS Ark Royal and found the Bismarck

References

External links
 
 Tiffin Girls' School
 Edubase

News items
 Telegraph January 2009

Educational institutions established in 1880
Grammar schools in the Royal Borough of Kingston upon Thames
Boys' schools in London
1880 establishments in England
Academies in the Royal Borough of Kingston upon Thames
Specialist arts colleges in England
Specialist language colleges in England